Conrad Keefe Cyr (December 9, 1931 – July 28, 2016) was a United States circuit judge of the United States Court of Appeals for the First Circuit and a United States District Judge of the United States District Court for the District of Maine.

Education and early career 

Born in Limestone, Maine, Cyr received a Bachelor of Science degree from College of the Holy Cross in 1953 and a Juris Doctor from Yale Law School in 1956. He was in private practice of law in Limestone, Maine, from 1956 to 1959, and in Bangor, Maine from 1961 to 1962, serving in the interim as an Assistant United States Attorney in Bangor. He was a referee in bankruptcy for the District of Maine from 1961 to 1973.

Federal judicial service

District court service
Cyr served as a federal bankruptcy judge from 1973 to 1981, and was Chief Judge of the Bankruptcy Appellate Panel for the First Circuit from 1980 to 1981. On August 11, 1981, President Ronald Reagan nominated Cyr to the United States District Court for the District of Maine vacated by George J. Mitchell, who had resigned following his appointment as a United States Senator. Cyr was confirmed by the United States Senate on September 25, 1981, and received his commission on September 28, 1981. Cyr served as Chief Judge of that District from 1983 to 1989. His service terminated on November 20, 1989, due to elevation to the First Circuit.

Appeals court service
On August 4, 1989, President George H. W. Bush nominated Cyr to serve on the First Circuit, in the seat vacated when Frank M. Coffin assumed senior status. Cyr was confirmed by the Senate on October 24, 1989 and received his commission on November 20, 1989. Cyr assumed senior status on January 31, 1997 and continued to hear cases for several years afterwards. He was succeeded by fellow Maine resident Kermit Lipez.

Death
Cyr died on July 28, 2016, at the age of 84. He is interred in Saint Louis Cemetery in his hometown of Limestone, Maine, alongside his parents, Louis and Kathleen, and sister, Marilyn, who preceded him in death by ten months.

Notes

References 
  

1931 births
2016 deaths
Assistant United States Attorneys
College of the Holy Cross alumni
Judges of the United States Court of Appeals for the First Circuit
Judges of the United States District Court for the District of Maine
People from Limestone, Maine
People from Bangor, Maine
United States court of appeals judges appointed by George H. W. Bush
United States district court judges appointed by Ronald Reagan
20th-century American judges
Yale Law School alumni
Judges of the United States bankruptcy courts
Judges of the United States Foreign Intelligence Surveillance Court